Bhitiwala is a village in Malout tehsil of Sri Muktsar Sahib district, Punjab, India.

Geography and climate
The soil of Bhitiwala is fertile. 'Lambi Distributory' the canal runs in the east of the village. It is built on high land than the land of main village. 'Bahawala Sem Naala'(the drain) has been built. There are five ponds (Chhapar in Punjabi) in the village.

History

It is an old village. Before 1947, Muslims were also inhabitants of the village. Telis Muslims were also among them. Muslims migrated in 1947. During riots in Punjab this village remained peaceful and no violent incident happened. Sikhs were always in majority. Sant Tehaldas ji of Udasin  (tradition) has an important place in the history of this village. He used to live in a hut near a canal. He had a simple living. He was a revered man among people; he gave a message of love and cooperation. He told people of Bhitiwala that village Bhitiwala will remain always peaceful but always should be careful about the water of the canal. Sant Tahaldas died on 5 December 1957.

Governance
Bhitiwala has a grampanchayat status. Pawandeep singh is Sarpanch of village.

Culture
Punjabi is the main language. Women wear Punjabi suits. Some changes in the culture has been seen in last decades. Women have almost left spinning on Charkha. Tiyaan is not held now. Homes are equipped with modern electronic appliances. Dth and FM radio has changed mode of entertainment. Kothis aka English bungalows are taking place of old havelis. Bagri a dialect of Rajasthani language is also spoken by some people mainly living in south-east of village.

Attractions

Samadh of Baba Tehaldas is sightworthy. It is located in south-east of Bhitiwala. Barsi (Death anniversary) of Baba Tehaldas is celebrated on 20 Magghar. A Guruduara has been built on Abohar-Dabwali road.

Sports
Cricket, kabbadi, and volleyball are very popular here.

Gallery

References

Neighbouring Villages

Villages in Sri Muktsar Sahib district